The Firehole River is located in northwestern Wyoming, and is one of the two major tributaries of the Madison River. It is part of the Missouri River system.

Description
The Firehole River flows through several significant geyser basins in Yellowstone National Park to include the Upper Geyser Basin, which contains the world-famous geyser Old Faithful. The river was named by early trappers for the steam that makes it appear to be smoking as if on fire.

The Firehole flows over three of Yellowstone's major waterfalls: Kepler Cascades south of Old Faithful, Firehole Falls and the Cascades of the Firehole in Firehole Canyon.

The river is surrounded by geothermal features which empty water into it. One effect of the input of this water is to increase the temperature of the water.

Water entering the river from geothermal features contains dissolved chemicals and minerals. Levels of boron and arsenic have been found to be above the standard limits for protection of aquatic organisms. Despite these levels, brown and rainbow trout live and spawn in the river.

The river contains an invasive species, the New Zealand mud snail (Potamopyrgus antipodarum).

Tributaries
Significant tributaries of the Firehole are the Little Firehole River, Fairy Creek, Iron Spring Creek, Sentinel Creek and Nez Perce Creek. All these tributaries bring cool waters to the Firehole and provide refuge for trout in the mainstem during mid-summer high temperatures caused by geothermal activity.

Angling

The Firehole River is a famous and storied destination for serious fly fishermen. When it was discovered in the 1830s by American explorers, the Firehole was barren of trout above what is now called Firehole Falls. Brook trout were first introduced to the upper Firehole in 1889, while brown trout, the river's most plentiful trout today, was first stocked in 1890. Rainbow trout were not introduced until 1923. Mountain whitefish are native to the Firehole below Firehole Falls. By the late 19th century, the Firehole and Yellowstone National Park in general was a popular destination for fishermen. In 1955 all stocking programs in the park were discontinued and today's Firehole trout are completely wild populations. In 1968, based on increasing pressure on the Firehole, the Gibbon and Madison rivers, the National Park Service designated these waters as Fly Fishing Only.

Gallery

See also
 Angling in Yellowstone National Park
 Fishes of Yellowstone National Park
 Fly fishing
 Tributaries of the Missouri River

References

Further reading
 
 
 
 
 
 
 
 

Rivers of Wyoming
Rivers of Yellowstone National Park
Tributaries of the Missouri River
Rivers of Teton County, Wyoming